Nudity is one of the physiological characteristics of humans, who alone among primates evolved to be effectively hairless. Human sexuality includes the physiological, psychological, and social aspects of sexual feelings and behaviors. In many societies, a strong link between nudity and sexuality is taken for granted. Other societies maintain their traditional practices of being completely or partially naked in social as well as private situations, such as going to a beach or spa.  The meaning of nudity and sexuality remains ambivalent, often leading to cultural misunderstandings and psychological problems.

Sexual response to social nudity

The link between the nude body and a sexual response is reflected in the legal prohibition of indecent exposure in the majority of societies.

Worldwide, there are some societies which recognize some places and activities that, although public, are appropriate for partial or complete nudity. These include societies that maintain traditional norms regarding nudity which reflect the origins of humanity; and modern societies that have large numbers of people who have adopted naturism in recreational activities. Naturists typically adopt a number of behaviors, such as refraining to touch, in order to avoid sexual responses while participating in nude activities, such as nude beaches.

Naturism and sex 
Some naturists do not maintain this non-sexual atmosphere. In a 1991 article in Off Our Backs, Nina Silver presents an account of mainstream sexual culture's intrusion into some American naturist groups. Nudist resorts may attract misogynists or pedophiles who are not always dealt with properly, and some resorts may cater to "swingers" or have sexually provocative events to generate revenue or attract members.

Breasts and sexuality 
In many societies, the breast continues to be associated with nurturing babies as well as sexuality. The "topfreedom" movement promotes equal rights for women to be naked above the waist in public on the same basis that would apply to men in the same circumstances. Breastfeeding in public is forbidden in some jurisdictions, not regulated in others, and protected as a legal right in still others. Where public breastfeeding is a legal right, some mothers may be reluctant to breastfeed, and some people may object to the practice.

Sexualization 
The American Psychological Association (APA) defines sexualization as limiting a person's value to sexual appeal to the exclusion of other characteristics, and equating physical attractiveness with being sexy. A person may also be sexually objectified, made into a thing for others' sexual use, rather than seen as a person with the capacity for independent action and decision making; or sexuality is inappropriately imposed upon a person. Being sexualized is particularly damaging to young people who are in the process of developing their own self-image. Girls may have sexualized expectations imposed upon them, or internalize norms that lead to self-sexualization. Sexualization of girls includes both age-inappropriate "sexy" attire for girls, and adult models dressing as girls. In movies and television, women are shown nude much more frequently than men, and generally in the context of sexual behavior.

Some see the APA position as viewing sexual images as uniformly negative, and overestimating the influence of these images on young people by assuming that exposure leads directly to negative effects, as if it were a disease. Studies also fail to address the effect of sexual images on boys which influences how they view their own masculinity and appropriate sexual relationships.

While there has been considerable media and political discussion of sexualization, there has been little psychological research on what effect media images actually have on the well-being of young people, for example how and to what degree sexual objectification is internalized, becoming self-evaluation. In interviews with Dutch pre-teens, the effects are complicated given the general liberal attitudes toward sexuality, including the legalization of prostitution, which is highly visible.

Researchers see the cultural force of commodification (or "pornification") as resulting in the sexualization of athletic bodies, negating the naturalness and beauty of nudity. This is in contrast to the sacredness of the nude athlete in the ancient world, particularly Greece; and the aesthetic appreciation of the nude in art.

Psychological disorders of bodily display
Exhibitionistic disorder is a condition marked by the urge, fantasy, or act of exposing one's genitals to non-consenting people, particularly strangers; and voyeuristic disorder is a sexual interest in, or practice of, spying on people engaged in intimate behaviors like undressing or sexual activity. While similar terms may be used loosely to refer to everyday activity, these feelings and behaviors are a indicative of a mental disorder only if they interfere with normal functioning or well-being, or involve causing discomfort or alarm to others. Much rarer is gymnophobia, an abnormal and persistent fear of nudity.

See also 

 Breastfeeding in public
 Nudity
 Nudity in film

References

Sources

Books

Journal articles

News

Websites

Nudity
Sexuality